Neris Regional Park covers about 10,000 hectares in Lithuania. Its territory lies within the Vilnius district municipality, the Trakai district municipality, and the Elektrėnai municipality. Portions of the park are privately owned.

The park is divided into zones, including 11 restricted nature reserves and a cultural reserve. The most heavily wooded of Lithuania's regional parks, it includes one of the largest and oldest surviving stands of oak trees in the country.

References

 Official website

Regional parks of Lithuania
Tourist attractions in Vilnius County